"Higher" is a song by American rapper Eminem, released as the ninth track from the deluxe edition of his eleventh studio album Music to Be Murdered By, by Interscope, Aftermath, and Shady Records. It was produced by Eminem himself and was written by Eminem, Luis Resto, Mike Strange, Andre Brissett, and Sly "Pyper" Jordan, the latter of which provides additional vocals.

Music video
The music video for "Higher" was released on January 23, 2021. It premiered during the pre-game show for UFC 257, which featured a rematch between Dustin Poirier and Conor McGregor. The video features clips from the UFC championship and contains a skit featuring a cameo from Dana White. The video pays homage to LL Cool J and his 1991 music video for "Mama Said Knock You Out".

Reception
The song was well received by critics, who praised its motivational and inspirational themes. It has been called an "anthem for the sports world" and a "spiritual successor to [Eminem's] 2002 track ''Till I Collapse'".

Personnel
Marshall Mathers – main artist, vocals, songwriter, producer
Luis Resto – songwriter, keyboards
Sly "Pyper" Jordan – writer, additional vocals
Mike Strange – writer, recorder, mixer
Andre Brissett – writer
Tony Campana – recorder

References

2020 songs
Eminem songs
Songs written by Eminem
Songs written by Luis Resto (musician)